David Stakston (born David Alexander Sjøholt; November 22, 1999) is a Norwegian-American actor. He is best known for his role as Magnus Fossbakken in the Norwegian teen drama Skam, and as Magne Seier in the Netflix fantasy drama series Ragnarok.

Biography 
Stakston was born on November 22, 1999 in Raleigh, North Carolina and grew up in both Florida and Oslo, Norway.

In 2015, Stakston starred as one of the main characters in the Norwegian drama web series Skam, which became very popular in Nordic countries. In the following years he made a few shorter appearances on Norwegian television. Since 2020, he has played Magne Seier, the main character of the Norwegian Netflix fantasy drama series Ragnarok.

Filmography

Film

Television

References

External links 
 

1999 births
Living people
Norwegian male film actors
Norwegian male stage actors
Norwegian male television actors
People from Raleigh, North Carolina